St. Trinian's 2: The Legend of Fritton's Gold  is a soundtrack album to the 2009 film St. Trinian's 2: The Legend of Fritton's Gold. It was released on December 14, 2009 via Polydor Records. It features eight songs produced by Xenomania: five by the Banned of St Trinian's and three by Girls Aloud member Sarah Harding.

Track listing

References

Albums produced by Xenomania
Adventure film soundtracks
2009 soundtrack albums
Polydor Records soundtracks
Comedy film soundtracks